Everything Now is the fifth studio album by Canadian indie rock band Arcade Fire, released on July 28, 2017, through Sonovox Records (physical release), Columbia Records, and Rough Trade Records. It was produced by Arcade Fire, alongside Thomas Bangalter of the electronic-house duo Daft Punk and Steve Mackey, the bassist of the band Pulp. Additionally, Markus Dravs, one of Arcade Fire's frequent collaborators, co-produced two tracks, and he, Geoff Barrow of Portishead, and Eric Heigle each provided additional production on one track.

The album is a departure from the sound of Arcade Fire's previous records, influenced as it is by synth-pop, dance-rock, and other derivatives of electronic music, and has been called more "digestible" than their earlier output. It was promoted by an elaborate marketing campaign, as well as five singles: the title track, "Creature Comfort", "Signs of Life", "Electric Blue", and "Put Your Money on Me".

Upon release, Everything Now proved polarizing with critics—some reviews said it was a misstep for the band, but several publications named it one of the best albums of the year. It reached the top of the charts in numerous countries, including Arcade Fire's home country of Canada, the US, and the UK.

Promotion
In May 2017, Arcade Fire performed six new songs at an intimate secret show in Montreal.
Later that month, a Twitter account designed to look like a Russian spambot started publishing clues pertaining to a new Arcade Fire album.

On May 31, the band released the lead single "Everything Now" on 12" vinyl, selling it at a merchandise stall at the Primavera Sound festival in Barcelona, which they headlined. A day later, a mysterious live stream called "Live From Death Valley" was launched, and the band released a music video for "Everything Now" that appeared to have been shot in Death Valley, California.

On June 3, anagrams of song titles were published on Twitter.

On June 16, the band posted the music video for "Creature Comfort" on its YouTube page. It was marketed with a Facebook post that was purportedly written by a disgruntled "Everything Now Corp" employee, in which he railed against the band's refusal to engage in corporate promotion of its new album.

Similar satirical marketing done in promotion of the album stemmed from a fictional agreement the band was in: a "360 degree agreement" proposed by Everything Now Corp, whereby the band created multiple fake online articles related to events happening within the company and band. These include, but are not limited to, the band providing a "premature premature evaluation" of Everything Now days before release as a spoof of online music reviews, a review of a fake installment in the rhythm video game series Rock Band titled Arcade Fire: Rock Band, and fake advertisements for products based on the names of songs from Everything Now. A collection of promotional articles created by the band are included on the side of a fake website that leads to numerous other fake websites.

Infinite Content tour
To promote the album, the band embarked on the Infinite Content tour across Europe and North and South America. Preceding the album's release, the band went on a near two-month-long tour of Europe, headlining festivals and their own shows, which included appearances at some smaller venues. They extended the tour into 2018 to cover more venues in Europe and North America, following the Arena leg of the North American tour which was plagued with low turnout/ticket sales, the band played an additional leg in 2018 at smaller venues.

Artwork
The front cover of the album features a picture of an art installation in Death Valley created by the artist JR for the band that consisted of a billboard depicting a mountain range placed in front of the actual mountain range depicted on the billboard, which comments on the blurry line between artifice and reality in the modern world; the album's title appears on a sign below the billboard. The back cover features a man riding a horse, a camp fire, and an arcade machine on fire (a visual pun on the band's name). The entire scene was shot in many different lighting and weather conditions, and two variants of the artwork, labelled "Day" and "Night", were created for CD pressings, while twenty variants of the artwork were created for vinyl pressings, each with the title on the front cover in a different language and a unique photograph of the mountain-and-billboard-scene. The shrink wrap around the album had a radial dotted-line pattern on the front, suggesting the sky in the photograph was printed on the inside of a large dome structure, and a tracklist on the back, which was disguised as the logos of fictional companies that financed the album.

As a continuation of the commercialization theme, the booklet for the album was formatted to resemble a flyer for a supermarket, with the song durations appearing like dollar amounts.

Reception

At Metacritic, which assigns a normalized rating out of 100 to reviews from mainstream critics, Everything Now received an average score of 66 based on 39 reviews, indicating "generally favorable reviews"; some critics praised the album as one of the year's best, while others stated it was a serious misstep for the band.

Jeremy Winograd of Slant Magazine claimed that "The result is by far Arcade Fire's most upbeat and easily digestible album to date." Barry Nicolson of NME rated the album five stars out of five and wrote that "The Canadian art-rockers are bigger, bolder and more fearful of the future than ever". Will Hermes of Rolling Stone praised the album for its lyrical content, writing that it is "treacherous territory, but the band navigates it bravely, especially when it turns the critical lens on itself."

In a mixed review for The Guardian, Alexis Petridis wrote that the "desire to experiment musically isn't enough to make Everything Now a bad album – there are songs worth hearing and genuinely thrilling music here – but rather a flawed one." Jon Pareles of The New York Times wrote that "The title song finds a breezy balance between earnestness and exhilaration. Elsewhere, that balance falters, and Everything Now becomes a slighter album than its predecessors." Equally negative, Brendan Frank of Pretty Much Amazing wrote that "For the first time in their career, Arcade Fire haven’t made a record; they've manufactured one." Jeremy Larson of Pitchfork wrote that "Conceptually, the songs don't transcend their social critique, they succumb to it." Robert Christgau wrote in 2018 that he had only "laid off" the album because he did not "feel obliged to nail down every possible Honorable Mention"; he mused it might deserve a "One-Star Honorable Mention" (which means "a worthy effort consumers attuned to its overriding aesthetic or individual vision may well like"), but said he did not "consider it [his] obligation to history to make that call."

Accolades

Commercial performance
Everything Now debuted at number one on the Billboard 200 chart in the US with 100,000 album-equivalent units, of which 94,000 were pure album sales. It is Arcade Fire's third US number-one album.

Track listing

Credits and personnel
Credits adapted from liner notes and Tidal.

Arcade Fire
Win Butler – vocals, bass guitar, electric guitar
Régine Chassagne – vocals, piano, keyboards, keytar
Richard Reed Parry – electric guitar, bass guitar, backing vocals
Tim Kingsbury – acoustic guitar, electric guitar, bass guitar, backing vocals
Will Butler – keyboards, bass guitar, backing vocals
Jeremy Gara – drums

Production
Arcade Fire – production
Steve Mackey – production
Thomas Bangalter – production
Markus Dravs – co-production , additional production 
Geoff Barrow – additional production 
Eric Heigle – additional production , recording
Mark Lawson – additional recording
Iain Berryman – additional recording
Korey Richey – additional recording
Florian Lagatta – additional recording
Craig Silvey – mixing
Max Prior – mixing assistance
Greg Calbi – mastering

Additional musicians
Sarah Neufeld – backing vocals, string arrangements , strings 
Owen Pallett – string arrangements, piano , strings 
Arcade Fire – string arrangements
Daniel Lanois – pedal steel 
Thomas Bangalter – synthesizer , programming 
Geoff Barrow – synthesizer 
Mark Lawson – MPC 
Stuart Bogie – saxophone , flute 
Matt Bauder – saxophone 
Charlie Gabriel – saxophone 
Patrick Bebey – pygmy flute 
Willonson Duprate – congas 
Jean "Diol Kidi" Edmond – congas 
Korey Richey – drum machine 
Rebecca Crenshaw – strings 
Helen Gillet – strings 
Harmonistic Praise Crusade Choir 
Akia Nevills – choir vocals 
Kayla Jasmine – choir vocals 
Tracci Lee – choir vocals 
Jelly Joseph – choir vocals 

Design
JR – artwork
Marc Azoulay – artwork assistance
Camille Pajot – artwork assistance
Guillaume Cagniard – artwork assistance
Ping Pong Ping – album graphic design
Anton Corbijn – band portrait

Charts

Weekly charts

Year-end charts

Certifications and sales

References

2017 albums
Arcade Fire albums
Albums produced by Markus Dravs
Albums produced by Thomas Bangalter
Albums produced by Steve Mackey
Albums produced by Geoff Barrow
Columbia Records albums
Juno Award for Album of the Year albums